Andrew Liebmann (born June 8, 1979) is an American heir.

Biography
He has a PhD in astrophysics and is a former member of the Cargill board of directors. He was a graduate student at Montana State University. and was appointed to the board of directors in 2014 without previously having worked for the company. He is the son of Cargill heir Marianne Cargill Liebmann, who owns 1/18 of the Cargill family fortune.

References

1979 births
Montana State University alumni
American billionaires
Cargill people
Living people